The Sunshine State Conference men's basketball tournament is the annual conference basketball championship tournament for the NCAA Division II Sunshine State Conference. The tournament has been held annually since 1978. It is a single-elimination tournament and seeding is based on regular season records.

The winner receives the conference's automatic bid to the NCAA Men's Division II Basketball Championship.

Results

Championship records

 Schools highlighted in pink are former members of the Sunshine State Conference

See also
NCAA Division II men's basketball tournament

References

NCAA Division II men's basketball conference tournaments
Tournament
Recurring sporting events established in 1978